Mexican Creek is a stream in the U.S. state of South Dakota.

Mexican Creek has the name of "Mexican Ed" Sanchez, a local cattleman.

See also
List of rivers of South Dakota

References

Rivers of Haakon County, South Dakota
Rivers of South Dakota